The following is a list of yacht rock bands and artists.

 Yacht rock

Yacht soul
± Earth, Wind & Fire
± Michael Jackson
± Jermaine Jackson
James Ingram
± Quincy Jones
Sade
Minnie Riperton
Patrice Rushen
Dionne Warwick
Roberta Flack
± Bill Withers
El DeBarge
Grover Washington Jr.
± Stevie Wonder
Peabo Bryson
The Whispers
The Gap Band
Tavares

Notes
± Rock and Roll Hall of Fame inductee (either as member on a band, altogether and/or individually)

References

Yacht rock
Yacht rock
Yacht rock
Soul music